Aral is a village in Talas Region of Kyrgyzstan. It is part of the Talas District. Its population was 5,206 in 2021.

Population

References

Populated places in Talas Region